Charles Henry Prest (9 December 1841 – 4 March 1875) was an English amateur first-class cricketer, who played five first-class matches from 1861 to 1870.  He appeared for the Gentlemen of the North against the Gentlemen of the South at Trent Bridge in 1861, and for Oxford University versus Southgate at the Magdalen College Ground, Oxford in 1864.

Born in York, England, Prest played two matches for Yorkshire, against Cambridgeshire and Surrey in 1864, and in one final game for Middlesex against Surrey at The Oval in 1870.  A right-handed batsman he scored 132 runs at 13.20, with a best of 57 against Southgate.

A prolific scorer in club cricket, he played regularly for the Yorkshire Gentlemen when his other interests allowed. He was also a sprinter of note, and achieved fame as an actor in London under the name 'Mr. Peveril', before turning professional.

Prest died, aged 35, in March 1875 in Gateshead, County Durham, England.

His brother, William Prest, played sixteen matches for Sheffield Cricket Club.

References

External links
Cricinfo Profile

Yorkshire cricketers
1841 births
1875 deaths
Cricketers from York
English cricketers
English male stage actors
Middlesex cricketers
Southgate cricketers
Gentlemen of the North cricketers
19th-century English male actors
English cricketers of 1826 to 1863
English cricketers of 1864 to 1889